Archibald Kennedy, 3rd Marquess of Ailsa (1 September 1847 – 9 April 1938) was a Scottish peer.

Early life
Archibald was born on 1 September 1847, the eldest of three sons born to Julia (née Jephson), Marchioness of Ailsa, and Archibald Kennedy, 2nd Marquess of Ailsa. Among his siblings was Maj Lord Alexander Kennedy, Lord John Kennedy, Lady Julia Alice Kennedy, Lady Evelyn Anne Kennedy, and Lady Constance Eleanor Kennedy.

His father was the eldest son of Archibald Kennedy, Earl of Cassilis, himself the oldest son of Archibald Kennedy, 1st Marquess of Ailsa.  His mother was the second daughter of Sir Richard Jephson, 1st Baronet and the former Charlotte Rochfort Smith.

Career
As a young man, he served as an officer in the Coldstream Guards. In 1885, he founded the Ailsa Shipbuilding Company, which was based in Troon and Ayr, Ayrshire.

Peerage
Upon the death of his father on 20 March 1870, he succeeded to the titles of 14th Earl of Cassilis, 16th Lord Kennedy, 3rd Marquess of Ailsa and 3rd Baron Ailsa. Along with the title came 76,000 acres in Ayrshire. He held the office of Lord-Lieutenant of Ayrshire between 1919 and 1937.

Personal life

Lord Ailsa was twice married. His first marriage took place on 7 March 1871 to Hon. Evelyn Stuart, daughter of Charles Stuart, 12th Lord Blantyre and Lady Evelyn Sutherland-Leveson-Gower (herself a daughter of George Sutherland-Leveson-Gower, 2nd Duke of Sutherland). Together, they were the parents of five children:

 Archibald Kennedy, 4th Marquess of Ailsa (1872–1943), who married Frances Stewart, daughter of Sir Mark MacTaggart-Stewart, 1st Baronet.
 Charles Kennedy, 5th Marquess of Ailsa (1875–1956), who married Constance Clarke, widow of Sir John Baird.
 Lady Evelyn Kennedy (1876–1886), who died young.
 Lady Aline Kennedy (1877–1957), who married John Edward Browne, 5th Baron Kilmaine (1878–1946) in 1901.
 Angus Kennedy, 6th Marquess of Ailsa (1882–1957), who married Gertrude Millicent Cooper.

He married secondly on 3 November 1891 to Isabella MacMaster, the only daughter of Hugh MacMaster, a market gardener of Kausani, India. Together, they had two more children:

 Lt.-Col. Lord Hugh Kennedy (1895–1970), who married Katharine Louisa Clare Atherton, daughter of Francis Henry Atherton.
 Lady Marjory Kennedy (b. 1898), who married Sir Laurence Pierce Brooke Merriam, MC.

Lord Ailsa died at his home, Culzean Castle, overlooking the Firth of Clyde where he was known as one of the foremost floriculturists, on 9 April 1938.

Sailing 

He was a keen sailor, having studied navigation, and had William Fife build him Foxhound in 1870, Bloodhound in 1874 and Sleuthhound in 1881. He had his own shipyard at Culzean Castle, where he built the 5-ton Cocker.

References

External links

1847 births
1938 deaths
Deputy Lieutenants of Ayrshire
Lord-Lieutenants of Ayrshire
Coldstream Guards officers
Directors of the Glasgow and South Western Railway
Archibald
Scottish people of Dutch descent
Schuyler family
Van Cortlandt family
3